Point Blank is a city in San Jacinto County, Texas, United States. The population was 643 at the 2020 census.

History

Florence Dissiway, a French woman from Alabama, who worked as a governess for a local family, gave the community the name Blanc Point  1850, which was later changed to Point Blank.

Geography

Point Blank is located at  (30.747241, –95.211138) along the banks of Lake Livingston.

Demographics

As of the 2020 United States census, there were 643 people, 388 households, and 249 families residing in the city.

As of the census of 2000, there were 559 people, 267 households, and 181 families residing in the city. The population density was 296.9 people per square mile (114.8/km). There were 403 housing units at an average density of 214.1 per square mile (82.8/km). The racial makeup of the city was 82.47% White, 13.95% African American, 0.54% Native American, 0.36% Asian, 1.07% from other races, and 1.61% from two or more races. Hispanic or Latino of any race were 3.76% of the population.

There were 267 households, out of which 13.5% had children under the age of 18 living with them, 58.1% were married couples living together, 6.0% had a female householder with no husband present, and 32.2% were non-families. 25.8% of all households were made up of individuals, and 12.0% had someone living alone who was 65 years of age or older. The average household size was 2.09 and the average family size was 2.48.

In the city, the population was spread out, with 13.8% under the age of 18, 5.0% from 18 to 24, 17.7% from 25 to 44, 32.9% from 45 to 64, and 30.6% who were 65 years of age or older. The median age was 56 years. For every 100 females, there were 94.8 males. For every 100 females age 18 and over, there were 95.1 males.

The median income for a household in the city was $31,875, and the median income for a family was $38,036. Males had a median income of $39,000 versus $23,125 for females. The per capita income for the city was $21,804. About 10.3% of families and 18.3% of the population were below the poverty line, including 40.0% of those under age 18 and 22.9% of those age 65 or over.

Notable people
George Tyler Wood, second Governor of Texas

References

External links

City of Point Blank, Texas

Cities in San Jacinto County, Texas
Cities in Texas
Greater Houston